Edmondes is a surname. Notable people with the surname include:

Charles Edmondes (1838–1893) English clergyman
Clement Edmondes (c. 1568–1622) English government politician 
Frederic Edmondes (1840–1918) Archdeacon of Llandaff
Thomas Edmondes (1563–1639) English politician
William Edmondes (1903–1968) Australian politician